{{Infobox AFL biography
| name = Adam McCarthy
| image = 
| fullname = Adam McCarthy
| birth_date = 
| birth_place = 
| death_date = 
| death_place = 
| originalteam = Scoresby
| height = 185 cm
| weight = 81 kg
| position = 
| statsend = 1996
| years1 = 1992–1994
| club1 = North Melbourne
| games_goals1 = 15 (3)
| years2 = 1995–1996 –| club2 = Fitzroy
| games_goals2 = 15 (9)
| games_goalstotal = 30 (12)
| careerhighlights = 
}}Adam McCarthy''' (born 14 February 1972) is a former Australian rules footballer who played with North Melbourne and Fitzroy in the Australian Football League (AFL).

McCarthy, a midfielder from Scoresby, won a best and fairest award at the North Melbourne Under-19s. He made eight senior appearances in 1992, didn't feature at all in 1993, then played seven games in 1994. At the end of the 1994 season, McCarthy was traded to Fitzroy, in exchange for Matthew Armstrong. He played 13 games for Fitzroy in 1995 but made just two more appearances.

References

1972 births
Australian rules footballers from Victoria (Australia)
North Melbourne Football Club players
Fitzroy Football Club players
Living people